László Makrai (born 8 January 1985) is a Hungarian professional footballer who plays for Ceglédi VSE.

Club statistics

Updated to games played as of 18 May 2014.

References

HLSZ 

1985 births
Living people
People from Vác
Hungarian footballers
Association football defenders
Vác FC players
FC Felcsút players
BKV Előre SC footballers
Gyirmót FC Győr players
Veszprém LC footballers
Ceglédi VSE footballers
FC Dabas footballers
Nemzeti Bajnokság I players
Nemzeti Bajnokság II players
Sportspeople from Pest County